is the first physical single (second overall) by Japanese producer and Capsule member Yasutaka Nakata, and as well as the 13th single by Japanese model-singer Kyary Pamyu Pamyu, released on January 18, 2017. The single was released in both CD and digital editions, also marking their first split single. It is also marked as the first collaboration single with British singer and songwriter Charli XCX.

Both songs were used as promotion for two different events: the "Special DJ + Live Zepp Tour 2016: YSTK x KPP" and the "Asobinite!!!- Kyary Pamyu Pamyu Birthday Special: YSTK x KPP Club Edition".

Background, production and release
"Crazy Crazy" was composed by Nakata with lyrics by Charli XCX. Pamyu Pamyu had wanted to collaborate with an outside artist for some time. Nakata later confirmed that Charli XCX was the artist that they were collaborating with. While recording the song, Pamyu Pamyu had difficulty singing in full English.

The teaser video for "Crazy Crazy" was produced by Nakata and shot in Los Angeles and Tokyo. Actual audience participation during the music video was endorsed using "Face Swap" which was popularized by Snapchat. The music video was released on January 26, 2017.

Track listing

References

2017 singles
2017 songs
Crazy Crazy
Kyary Pamyu Pamyu songs
Crazy Crazy
Song recordings produced by Yasutaka Nakata
Songs written by Yasutaka Nakata
Unborde singles
Warner Music Group singles
Crazy Crazy
Split singles
Crazy Crazy
Harajuku Iyahoi
Harajuku Iyahoi